Jackson City School (under the Jackson Independent School system) is a school district serving grades pre-k through 12.  It is located in the hills of Eastern Kentucky, in Jackson, Kentucky—the county seat for Breathitt County.

The elementary school portion is named after Herbert W. Spencer, after it was rebuilt in the 1960s when the original elementary school caught fire. Though, locally, it's still referred to as Jackson Elementary or just Jackson City School.

Athletics

Boys' Varsity 
Basketball
Baseball

Girls' Varsity 
Basketball
Softball
Volleyball

Co-Ed Varsity 
Golf
Soccer
Track & Field

Mascot and school colors 
The mascot for Jackson City Schools are the tigers (for boys' and co-ed teams) and the lady tigers (for girls' teams).  The school colors are purple and gold.

External links

 Jackson City School
 Jackson City School meets NCLB goals

Public elementary schools in Kentucky
Public middle schools in Kentucky
Schools in Breathitt County, Kentucky
Public high schools in Kentucky